Ennis was a constituency represented in the Irish House of Commons until 1800, the lower house in the Irish Parliament of the Kingdom of Ireland. In the Patriot Parliament summoned by James II in 1689, Ennis was represented with two members. Following the Acts of Union 1800, it was succeeded by the Ennis constituency in the United Kingdom House of Commons.

By 1783, the seat was in the control of the O'Brien and Burton families. Notable members include Sir Edward O'Brien, 4th Baronet. When his son, the Tory turned Irish rebel, William Smith O'Brien, became MP for the then UK Parliamentary seat of Ennis, The Times described the constituency as "his father's borough".

Members of Parliament, 1613–1801
1613 John Thornton of Doonass and Edmond Blood of Bohersallagh
1634–1635 Sir Barnaby O’Brien (sat for Carlow-replaced by Francis Windebank) and Sir Richard Sudwell 
1639–1649 Simon Thorogood (replaced 1641 by Robert Casey) and Ralph Leventhorpe
1661–1666 William Purefoy of King's County and Isaac Granier of Kilrush

1689–1801

Notes

References

Bibliography

James Frost,The History and Topography of the County of Clare

Constituencies of the Parliament of Ireland (pre-1801)
Ennis
Historic constituencies in County Clare
1613 establishments in Ireland
1800 disestablishments in Ireland
Constituencies established in 1613
Constituencies disestablished in 1800